The Black Cobra is a 1963 Austrian Crime film directed by Rudolf Zehetgruber and starring Adrian Hoven.

Cast
 Adrian Hoven - Peter Karner
 Ann Smyrner - Alexa Bergmann
 Wolfgang Preiss - Stanislas Raskin
 Paul Dahlke - Dr.Langhammer, Kommissar
 Hans Richter - Insp. Knecht
 Peter Vogel - Krim.Ass. Dr. Alois Dralle
 Emmerich Schrenk - Freddy
 Klaus Löwitsch - Boogie
 Klaus Kinski - Koks-Charly / Charley 'The Snow'
 Marianne Schönauer - Paola Manuzzo
 Raoul Retzer - Martinez Manuzzo
 Herbert Fux - Marco
 Günter Meisner - Wunderlich ('Mr. Green')
 C. W. Fernbach - Lullaby
 Ady Berber - Punkti
 Hilde Wagener - Baronin Wyspianski
 Michel Ujevic - Goba
 Terry Van Ginderen - Simone, Barfrau

References

External links

1963 films
1963 crime films
1960s German-language films
Austrian black-and-white films
Films directed by Rudolf Zehetgruber
Austrian crime films